EFY Enterprises, also known as EFY Group, is a privately held Indian technology-oriented publishing organisation based in New Delhi. The initial publication of the EFY Group was Electronics For You, a monthly electronics magazine that was first published in 1969. The EFY Group currently manages six magazines, six web portals, five annual events, four Facebook communities, a directory, and around 30 book titles. The company also provides hands-on training courses, and manufactures and markets Do-It-Yourself electronics projects and hobby kits. Its revenue is over 11 million rupees per year. The organisation hires 200 employees, who are situated mostly in southeast Asia. Two more organisations are part of the group: IT Solutions India Pvt Ltd and Kits’n’Spares.

EFY Group publications 
Some magazines and web properties by EFY Group are:
 Electronics For You
 Open Source For You (before Linux For You)
 EFY Times
 EFY Mag Online
 Electronics For U
 Electronics Industry Directory
 Facts For You
 Electronics Bazaar
 BPO Times

EFY training and events 
EFY also conducts a set of major events on a regular basis, targeting design engineers, developers, technologists, and technical decision makers. The biggest in India among these is EFY Conferences, under which comes Electronics Rocks as well as the IoTShow.in event. These events also have short-term technical courses that are designed to provide students with practical hands-on training.

References 

Magazine publishing companies of India
Companies based in New Delhi